Albania participated in the Eurovision Song Contest 2009 in Moscow, Russia, with the song "Carry Me in Your Dreams" performed by Kejsi Tola. Its selected entry was chosen through the national selection competition Festivali i Këngës organised by Radio Televizioni Shqiptar (RTSH) in December 2008. Albania was drawn to compete in the second semi-final of the contest, which took place on 	14 May 2009. Performing as number 16, the nation was announced among the top 10 entries of the second semi-final and therefore qualified to compete in the grand final. In the final on 16 May 2009, it performed as number 19 and placed 17th out of the 25 participating countries, scoring 48 points.

Background 

The nation's highest placing in the contest, to this point, had been the seventh place, which it achieved in 2004 with the song "The Image of You" performed by Anjeza Shahini. Albania's national broadcaster, Radio Televizioni Shqiptar (RTSH), has organised Festivali i Këngës since its inauguration in 1962. Since 2003, the winner of the competition has simultaneously won the right to represent Albania in the Eurovision Song Contest.

Before Eurovision

Festivali i Këngës 
RTSH organised the 47th edition of Festivali i Këngës to determine Albania's representative for the Eurovision Song Contest 2009. The competition consisted of two semi-finals on 19 and 20 December, respectively, and the grand final on 21 December 2008. The three live shows were hosted by Albanian singer Elsa Lila, composer Julian Deda and actor Gentian Zenelaj.

Competing entries

Shows

Semi-finals 

The semi-finals of Festivali i Këngës took place on 19 December and 20 December 2008, and were broadcast live at 20.45 (CET) on the respective dates. 
The first semi-final featured all 20 artists performing their entries, while in the second one each artist performed a duet with an other Albanian artist.

Final 
The grand final of Festivali i Këngës took place on 21 December 2008 and was broadcast live at 20.45 (CET). The winner was determined by the combination of the votes from a seven-member jury, consisting of E. Koço, G. Bojaxhi, F. Boshnjaku, G. Demaliaj, N. Çashku, M. Laze and L. Leopoldi. Kejsi Tola emerged as the winner with "Më merr në ëndërr" and was simultaneously announced as Albania's representative for the Eurovision Song Contest 2009.

At Eurovision 

The Eurovision Song Contest 2009 took place at the Olympic Stadium in Moscow, Russia and consisted of two semi-finals held on 12 and 14 May, respectively, and the grand final on 16 May 2009.

On 30 January 2009, a special allocation draw was held that placed each country into one of the two semi-finals, with Albania being placed into the second, to be held on 14 May. Once all the competing songs for the Eurovision Song Contest 2009 had been released, the running order for the semi-finals was decided by the delegation heads of the 42 participating countries rather than through another draw; the nation was set to perform at position 16, following  and preceding . In the grand final, it was announced that Albania would be performing 19th, following  and preceding .

Voting 

The tables below visualise a breakdown of points awarded to Albania in the second semi-final and grand final of the Eurovision Song Contest 2009, as well as by the nation on both occasions. The nation awarded its 12 points to Greece in both the semi-final and final of the contest.

Points awarded to Albania

Points awarded by Albania

Detailed voting results

References 

2009
Countries in the Eurovision Song Contest 2009
2008
Eurovision
Eurovision